The following highways are/were numbered 942:

Canada

United States